John Wilfred Bosa (born January 10, 1964) is a former American football defensive end who played three seasons for the Miami Dolphins of the National Football League (NFL).  He played football for Keene High School in Keene, New Hampshire and received a full athletic scholarship to play football for the Boston College Eagles.

John was selected by the Dolphins in the first round (16th overall) of the 1987 NFL Draft. His elder son, Joey Bosa, played college football at Ohio State University and was selected third overall in the 2016 NFL Draft by the San Diego Chargers. His younger son, Nick Bosa, also played college football at Ohio State and was selected second overall in the 2019 NFL Draft by the San Francisco 49ers. With that, the Bosas became the third family to have three members drafted in the first round of an NFL Draft behind The Matthews and the Mannings .

References

1964 births
Living people
People from Keene, New Hampshire
Players of American football from New Hampshire
American football defensive linemen
Boston College Eagles football players
Miami Dolphins players